Ulceby Skitter is a hamlet in North Lincolnshire, England. It is in the civil parish of Ulceby, a village 1 mile to the west, and is adjacent to Ulceby railway station.

References

External links

Hamlets in Lincolnshire
Borough of North Lincolnshire